The Channel [V] Thailand Music Video Awards established in 2002 by Channel [V] Thailand. The awards gives recognition and awards to Thai, International artist and Thai Music Video director.

Concept, venue

Award categories

Popular Awards
Choice by Viewers' vote

Thai
 Popular Music Video
 Popular Male Artist
 Popular Female Artist 
 Popular Duo or Group Artist
 Popular New Artist
Popular Music production DJ Mad

International
 Popular Music Video
 Popular Artist
 Popular New Artist 
 Popular Asian Artist

Best Awards
Decision by committee.
 Best Music Video
 Best Director
 Best Editing
 Best Cinematography 
 Best Visual Effects 
 Best Art Direction

Channel [V] Thailand Music Video Awards 2009

See also 
 Channel V
 Channel [V] Thailand
 Star TV
 True Visions

External links
Channel V Thailand

Thai music awards
Music video awards